Girl in the Headlines (AKA The Model Girl Murder Case) is a 1963 British detective film directed by Michael Truman and starring Ian Hendry, Ronald Fraser, Jeremy Brett, and Jane Asher. It is based on the 1961 novel The Nose on my Face by actor Laurence Payne.

Plot
Inspector Birkett and Sergeant Saunders are called in to investigate the murder of a glamorous model. It becomes apparent that the girl had led a chequered life and her acquaintances included drug dealers. Jordan and Hammond Barker are reluctant to help but when the police finally make an arrest, another murder occurs in a seedy Soho jazz café. But are the two murders connected?

Cast
 Ian Hendry – Inspector Birkett
 Ronald Fraser – Sergeant Saunders
 Margaret Johnston – Mrs Gray
 Natasha Parry – Perlita Barker
 Jeremy Brett – Jordan Barker
 Kieron Moore – Herter
 Peter Arne – Hammond Barker
 Jane Asher – Lindy Birkett
 Rosalie Crutchley – Maude Klein
 Robert Harris – William Lamotte
 Duncan Macrae – Barney  
 Zena Walker – Mildred Birkett  
 James Villiers – David Dane  
 Alan White – Inspector Blackwell  
 Martin Boddey – Inspector
 Marie Burke – Madame Lavalle 
 Patrick Holt – Walbrook
 Douglas Muir – Fingerprint expert

Critical reception
'Britmovie' called the film a "cleverly plotted thriller directed by ex-Ealing editor/producer Michael Truman... Hendry's committed performance and Fraser's underplayed support dominate the film as the two policemen on the case."

References

External links
 

1963 films
1960s crime thriller films
British black-and-white films
British crime thriller films
British mystery films
Films based on British novels
Films scored by John Addison
Police detective films
1960s English-language films
Films directed by Michael Truman
1960s British films